Mueller State Park is a Colorado state park encompassing  of land outside Divide, Colorado, west of Colorado Springs, Colorado. The park offers many outdoor activities. It is open in the winter and allows snowshoeing, sledding, and snowtubing. Mueller is a diverse home to a variety of animals including elk, black bear, eagles, hawks and bighorn sheep.

References

External links
 Mueller State Park

Protected areas established in 1988
Protected areas of Teller County, Colorado
State parks of Colorado